Prince Yu may refer to:

 Duke Huai of Jin, a ruler of the state of Jin in the Spring and Autumn period, known as Crown Prince Yu (太子圉) before he became Duke
 Prince Yu (豫) (豫親王), a Qing dynasty princely peerage created in 1636
 Prince Yu (裕) (裕親王), a Qing dynasty princely peerage created in 1667
 Prince Yu (愉) (愉郡王), a Qing dynasty princely peerage created in 1730